Cristina Simona Nedelcu (born 28 February 1987 in Bucharest, Romania)  is a Romanian aerobic gymnast who won the silver medal in the women's individual event at the 2008 Aerobic Gymnastics World Championships in Ulm. During her career she won four world championships medals (one silver and three gold), four European championships medals (two gold and two bronze) and six times national women's individual champion .

References

External links
 
 

1982 births
Living people
Romanian aerobic gymnasts
Female aerobic gymnasts
Medalists at the Aerobic Gymnastics World Championships
Competitors at the 2009 World Games
Gymnasts from Bucharest